Luddington  is a small village and civil parish in the English county of Warwickshire. The population in 2001 was 457, increasing to 475 at the 2011 Census. It is located about 5 kilometres (3 miles) outside the town of Stratford-upon-Avon on the banks of the river Avon and has views south over the Cotswolds. Facilities and communications include a phone box, a 19th-century church, a post box, a marina with a 17th-century lock, a village green and a recently refurbished village hall originally built in 1953. The parish encompasses Dodwell Caravan Park to the north of the village. The village is reputed to be the meeting place of Anne Hathaway and William Shakespeare, as Anne was from the parish, and local lore states that they probably conducted their courtship in the area.

History 

The name Luddington is of Old English origin meaning Luda's farmstead. Dodwell is also of Old English origin and means Dodda's well or spring. The village was originally accessed via a road running from the Evesham road down through Dodwell. This then continued through a ford in the river to Milcote. This first part of this road is now a footpath and the second part no longer exists. The village was part of the Ragley estate belonging to the Marquis of Hertford. One of the oldest building in the village is part of Boddington Farm, which dates from the 17th century. It marks the eastern boundary of the village's conservation area. During the English civil war, Robert Simcock's (Simcox) barn was emptied of its "carefully stored" apples by marauding troops.

Other old buildings include Clover Cottage, which is now part of a row of three cottages thought to formerly be one single-floor thatched cottage that has been split by a builder in the 20th century. Evidence of Clover Cottage dating back to before the 16th century was found during a recent (2015) renovation of the thatch in which the whole thatch was removed and replaced. Other important buildings include Sandfields Farm (now Luddington Grange), The Manor and The Cottage (now named The Old House). Luddington Manor is a Grade II listed building and was part of the Ragley estate, and a possible home of Anne Hathaway's family. The Cottage's front garden is shown on some maps to have been the original site of the church, where it is rumoured that the playwright and poet William Shakespeare may have married Anne Hathaway. The current church is not the church that stood in the village in Shakespeare's time, but is a 19th-century replacement and is on a different site. 

There are numerous half-timbered buildings. The former Methodist Chapel was opened in August 1932, in a farm building owned by Thomas Higginson, a local farmer and Methodist Local Preacher. Other more recent buildings have been allocated to the farm estates. The village green was given over to public (Common land) by the Marquis of Hertford of Ragley Hall at Arrow. Until at least 1990 Luddington was home to Luddington Experimental Horticulture Station (EHS), one of several such establishments around the country undertaking field research for the Agricultural Development and Advisory Service (ADAS) of the Department for Environment, Food and Rural Affairs Defra.

Economy 
The village is largely a dormitory village, with the majority of the inhabitants working elsewhere. Residence and community is the main activity within the village, with surrounding farms providing some employment opportunity. Regular transient workers living on the farm are encouraged to be involved in the village and this year (2015) there was even an "international tug-o-war competition, with finalists Lithuania vs Bulgaria showing that Luddington is a truly welcome place to be. 

Following the first suspected H5N1 bird flu outbreak in the United Kingdom, when a dead swan was found in Scotland, samples were sent to Luddington's now closed veterinary research facility for testing. Bomfords has frequently been at loggerheads with the village residents, who successfully took the company to court to prevent its very large goods vehicles driving through the village, resulting in a 7.5t limit on traffic and a massive reduction in the flow of vehicles. The Dodwell Trading Estate to the north of Luddington on the main Stratford-Evesham road, offers another source of employment and retail including bespoke joinery, antiques and unique homewares. Within the village, there is also a farrier and an organ building and repair business, a finance company and a healthcare/medical devices producer.

Village life 
The village has many events including Carols on the Green on Christmas Eve with a brass band and mulled wine. There is an annual village fête in the summer and regular social events including All Saints Arms pub nights, quiz nights, the Arts Club, annual flower show, Luddflicks (cinema evenings) and dance classes in the village hall. Other activities include fishing, boating and canoeing though there is no slipway. The route of the Stratford Marathon passes through the village and the villagers host a water station and toilet facilities at their homes and the hall.

Dodwell 

The construction of this park effectively doubled the parish's population and means that the parish has two separate centres of population. Dodwell was originally a farming hamlet on the Evesham Road from Stratford to Bidford west of Bordon Hill.

Youth 
The young people of the parish all reside in the village proper with no children living in Dodwell. Those of school age tend to attend schools within the  Stratford-on-Avon district, usually either in Stratford-upon-Avon or Alcester. There are few facilities for young people, apart from the swings on the green. There are no schools in the parish.

Transport 

There are limited bus services for both the village and Dodwell, but not between the two, though the walk between the two is 10 minutes and the bus can take you to within a 5-minute walk.

References

External links 

 Luddington Parish Plan contains detailed information about life in the parish, facilities and future improvements.
 Rewlach Methodist History article on the origins of Luddington Methodist Chapel

Villages in Warwickshire